Kampong Kembangan Constituency was a single member constituency in Kembangan, Singapore. In the early days from the 1959, this ward was created for the Kampong Kembangan after the dissolution of Ulu Bedok Constituency. It was subsequently merged into Aljunied Group Representation Constituency

Member of Parliament

Elections

Elections in 1980s

Elections in 1970s

Elections in 1960s

Elections in 1950s

Note 1: In 1957, Singapore Malay Union (SMU) was expelled by its alliance partners consisted of UMNO and MCA for fielding a candidate in that by-election which was the reason for the elections department of Singapore to view Fatimah as another independent candidate.

Note 2: UMNO, MCA and MIC together with Singapore People's Alliance was informally formed as an alliance in 1961, where it still within this term of election which was the reason for the elections department of Singapore to view Mohammed Ali as a candidate for Singapore Alliance.

References
1984 GE's result
1980 GE's result
1976 GE's result
1972 GE's result
1968 GE's result
1963 GE's result
1959 GE's result
Various wards name in 2001 GE, Aljunied GRC
Various wards name in 2006 GE, Marine Parade GRC
Brief History on Singapore Malay Union (Dissolved in the 1960s)
Brief History on Singapore Alliance

Bedok
1959 establishments in Singapore
1988 disestablishments in Singapore
Singaporean electoral divisions